Kusehha (also Romanized as Kūsehhā and Kūseh Hā; also known as Kūseh and Kūsheh) is a village in Beshiva Pataq Rural District, in the Central District of Sarpol-e Zahab County, Kermanshah Province, Iran. At the 2006 census, its population was 180, in 43 families.

References 

Populated places in Sarpol-e Zahab County